Mesastrape fulguraria is a moth in the family Geometridae. It is found in Japan, Taiwan and China.

The wingspan is 60–65 mm.

Subspecies
Mesastrape fulguraria fulguraria
Mesastrape fulguraria consors Butler, 1878 (Japan)
Mesastrape fulguraria intervolans Wehrli, 1941 (China)

References

Moths described in 1860
Boarmiini
Moths of Asia
Moths of Japan
Moths of Taiwan